A markland or merkland is an old Scottish unit of land measurement.

There was some local variation in the equivalences; for example, in some places eight ouncelands were equal to one markland, but in others, such as Islay, a markland was twelve ouncelands. The markland derived its name from the old coin, the Merk Scots (cognate with German mark and various other European coinages, see Mark (money)), which was the annual rent paid on it. It was based on this, rather than its actual area. Originally a Scots mark or merk was 13s 4d (160 pence), but the Scottish coinage depreciated against the English, and by the 18th century a Scots merk was worth only 131/3d sterling – one-twelfth of its original value. Although such coins were abolished by the Acts of Union 1707, some stayed in circulation for decades, and the names themselves remained in common use for centuries.

See also
 Obsolete Scottish units of measurement
 In the East Highlands:
 Rood
 Scottish acre = 4 roods
 Oxgang (Damh-imir) = the area an ox could plough in a year (around 20 acres)
 Ploughgate (?) = 8 oxgangs
 Daugh (Dabhach) = 4 ploughgates
 In the West Highlands:
 Groatland (Còta bàn) = basic unit
 Pennyland (Peighinn) = 2 groatlands
 Quarterland (Ceathramh) = 4 pennylands (8 groatlands)
 Ounceland (Tir-unga) = 4 quarterlands (32 groatlands)
 Markland (Marg-fhearann) = 8 ouncelands (varied)

References
  ((Dabhach, Peighinn, Unga) with corrections and additions).

Obsolete Scottish units of measurement
Units of area